"Be Quiet and Drive (Far Away)" is the second single released from the American alternative metal band Deftones' second album, Around the Fur. It was their first single to chart on the US charts, peaking at number 29 on the Mainstream Rock Tracks chart, and within the top 50 in the UK Singles Chart.

In 2012, Loudwire ranked the song number two on their list of the 10 greatest Deftones songs, and in 2020, Kerrang ranked the song number three on their list of the 20 greatest Deftones songs.

A music video was filmed to accompany the single's release, directed by Frank W. Ockenfels III.

Track listing
All tracks written by Deftones.

UK CD1
 "Be Quiet and Drive (Far Away)" – 5:08
 "Engine No. 9" (live) – 3:49
 "Teething" (live) – 3:34

UK CD2
 "Be Quiet and Drive (Far Away)" – 5:10
 "Be Quiet and Drive (Far Away) (remix)" [acoustic] – 4:33
 "Birthmark (live)" – 3:58

 All live tracks recorded live at the Melkweg, Amsterdam on October 13, 1997.

Charts

References

External links
 

Deftones songs
1998 singles
1997 songs
Maverick Records singles
Song recordings produced by Terry Date
Songs written by Stephen Carpenter
Songs written by Chi Cheng (musician)
Songs written by Abe Cunningham
Songs written by Chino Moreno
Shoegaze songs